Virtual Radar Client (VRC) is a Windows app that simulates the radar workstations of real-world air traffic controllers.  It allows the user to simulate the duties of air traffic controllers by viewing a radar display of, and data pertaining to virtual aircraft connected to the VATSIM network of air traffic and flight simulation.

Description

VRC is a program designed to emulate a radar screen used by air traffic controllers. It was created by Ross Carlson, and released by VATSIM to the flying public Friday, April 14, 2006. VRC sends and receives data in real-time to the VATSIM servers which allows users to provide the functions of ATC. VRC was created with multi-monitor users in mind, with all non-essential data being displayed in windows that can be moved to the second screen. It is one of three major radar clients, its rivals being ASRC and Euroscope.

VRC is not available for Macintosh or Linux based users, nor is ever planned to be. Some clients have reported being able to run VRC using Windows compatibility layers, such as Wine and Boot Camp. VRC is proprietary and closed-source software, but it is free.

On May 2, 2021, it was announced by the VRC developer, Ross Carlson, that the program has reached End of Life and that it will continue to "function for the foreseeable future". But is expecting to retire the program soon due to all of the technical upgrades happening behind the scenes at VATSIM.

Radar modes

See also
VATSIM
Air traffic control
Flight Simulator

References

External links
VATSIM Homepage
VRC Homepage

Air traffic control simulators
Virtual Air Traffic Simulation Network